Caesar Kleberg (September 20, 1873 – 1946) was an American conservationist who was born in Cuero, Texas, and was involved in the Norias Ranch Raid. He attended St. Edward's University in Austin, where he made it known that he was not "of an indoor nature". In 2009, he was acknowledged as "the father of wildlife conservation in Texas" by the Texas Legislature. Since 2008, the Wildlife Society  has awarded the Caesar Kleberg Award for Excellence in Applied Wildlife Research to  "those who have distinguished themselves in applied wildlife research"

References

American conservationists
1873 births
1946 deaths
St. Edward's University alumni
Texas Democrats
People from Cuero, Texas